Wyseotrypa is an extinct Permian genus of bryozoans of the family Hyphasmoporidae. It was discovered in northeastern Nevada.

References

Prehistoric bryozoan genera